Ritodrine (trade name Yutopar) is a tocolytic drug used to stop premature labor.  This drug has been removed from the US market, according to FDA Orange Book. It was available in oral tablets or as an injection and was typically used as the hydrochloride salt, ritodrine hydrochloride.

Mechanism
Ritodrine is a short-acting β2 adrenoreceptor agonist — a class of medication used for smooth muscle relaxation (other similar drugs are used in asthma or other pulmonary diseases such as salbutamol (albuterol)). Since ritodrine has a bulky N-substituent, it has high β2 selectivity. Also, the 4-hydroxy group on the benzene ring is important for activity as it is needed to form hydrogen bonds. However, the 4-hydroxy group makes it susceptible to metabolism by catechol-O-methyl transferase (COMT). Since it is β2-selective it is used for premature labor.

Side effects and potential contraindications
Most side effects of β2 agonists result from their concurrent β1 activity, and include increase in heart rate, rise in systolic pressure, decrease in diastolic pressure, chest pain secondary to myocardial infarction, and arrhythmia. Beta agonists may also cause fluid retention secondary to decrease in water clearance, which when added to the tachycardia and increased myocardial work, may result in heart failure. In addition, they increase gluconeogenesis in the liver and muscle resulting in hyperglycemia, which increases insulin requirements in diabetic patients. The passage of β agonists through the placenta does occur and may be responsible for fetal tachycardia, as well as hypoglycemia or hyperglycemia at birth.

Patients with type 2 diabetes, high blood pressure or migraines should bring this to their doctor's attention before receiving care.

It has also been associated with postpartum bleeding.

References

Beta2-adrenergic agonists
Phenols
Phenylethanolamines
Substituted amphetamines
Tocolytics